Alphonse Dante Bichette Sr. (born November 18, 1963) is an American former professional baseball player, currently employed by the Toronto Blue Jays organization. He played in Major League Baseball (MLB) as an outfielder for the California Angels (1988–1990), Milwaukee Brewers (1991–1992), Colorado Rockies (1993–1999), Cincinnati Reds (2000), and Boston Red Sox (2000–2001). He was also the hitting coach for the Rockies in 2013. He batted and threw right-handed.

Bichette was a four-time All-Star as a member of the Rockies, and was a member of the 1993 inaugural team. In 1995, he won the Silver Slugger Award and finished second in the Most Valuable Player Award (MVP) voting while leading the National League in home runs, runs batted in, slugging percentage, total bases and hits. The next year, he joined the 30–30 club with 31 home runs and 31 stolen bases, and in 1998, again led the league in hits with 219. Each year from 1993−1998 he batted over .300, and in each year from 1995−1999, drove in at least 100 runs.

Career

Professional career
Bichette attended Jupiter High School in Jupiter, Florida, and Palm Beach Community College. The California Angels drafted Bichette in the 17th round of the 1984 Major League Baseball draft.

Bichette made his MLB debut with the Angels in 1988, but was a streaky hitter and was traded to the Milwaukee Brewers in exchange for Dave Parker in 1991. After putting up only average numbers with Milwaukee, he was traded to the new expansion team, the Colorado Rockies. On April 7, 1993, he hit the first home-run in Rockies history, a solo shot off New York Mets pitcher Bret Saberhagen. Bichette was part of the "Blake Street Bombers" which also included sluggers Larry Walker, Andrés Galarraga, and Vinny Castilla.

He finished the Rockies' first season with 21 home runs and a .310 batting average, his personal best for both at the time. Bichette also hit his first home run at the newly constructed Coors Field, a 14th-inning smash against the Mets that secured an opening day victory for the Rockies in 1995. Bichette had his best season in 1995, coming very close to the Triple Crown with a .340 batting average, 40 home runs and 128 RBIs and barely lost the MVP voting to the Cincinnati Reds' Barry Larkin.

The 1996 season was only the second time ever that two players on the same team hit at least 30 home runs and collected 30 stolen bases, as Ellis Burks accomplished the same feat. Over the next three seasons, Bichette hit 26, 22 and 34 home runs for the Rockies. He remains in the top ten in many offensive categories for the Rockies. On June 10, 1998, Bichette became the first player to hit for the cycle in an interleague game, when he accomplished the feat against the Texas Rangers, capping it off with a walk-off single to win the game for the Rockies in 10 innings.

On April 4, 1999, the Rockies made history as they played their Opening Day contest at Estadio de Béisbol Monterrey in Monterrey, Mexico, marking the first time Major League Baseball (MLB) commenced the regular season outside of the United States or Canada. Their opponent was the defending National League champion San Diego Padres. Bichette collected four hits, drove in four runs, and homered as Colorado won 8–2.

By the end of the 1999 season, his production was beginning to drop and the Rockies dealt Bichette to the Cincinnati Reds. However, his fielding was suffering tremendously and Bichette was eventually traded to the Boston Red Sox for a season and a half and then the Los Angeles Dodgers. Bichette retired before ever playing a game with the Dodgers, on March 22, 2002.

In August 2004, Bichette rejoined professional baseball as a designated hitter, pitcher and occasional outfielder for the Atlantic League's Nashua Pride. Bichette won the Atlantic League's Player of the Month award for August (his first full month back). He completed the month with a .361 average and 13 homers. On August 28, he batted 4-for-5 with two home runs and eight RBIs.

Coaching career
On November 13, 2012, Bichette was hired to be the Colorado Rockies hitting coach, replacing Carney Lansford. He announced on September 24, 2013 that he would not return for the 2014 season.

On July 24, 2020, it was confirmed during the opening game of the Toronto Blue Jays season that Bichette had been added to the Jays coaching staff full-time after the summer camp.

On February 4, 2021, it was announced that Bichette would be reassigned as a "Special Assistant" within the Blue Jays' organization "to continue to have an impact throughout multiple levels of the organization." On February 9, 2022, Bichette left his position with the Blue Jays so he could train with his son, Bo. Due to the ongoing 2021–22 Major League Baseball lockout, Bichette had been unable to train with Bo and prioritized family over his position.

Career statistics
In 1,704 games over 14 seasons, Bichette posted a .299 batting average (1906-for-6381) with 934 runs, 401 doubles, 27 triples, 274 home runs, 1141 RBI, 152 stolen bases, 355 base on balls, .336 on-base percentage and .499 slugging percentage. He recorded a .974 fielding percentage playing at all three outfield positions. In his only postseason appearance, in the 1995 NLDS, he hit .588 (10-for-17) with six runs, three doubles, one home run and three RBI.

Personal life
In August 2005, Bichette's oldest son Dante Jr., participated in the Little League World Series with his Maitland, Florida, team. Dante Jr. was drafted 51st overall by the New York Yankees in 2011. Bichette's younger son, Bo, was selected by the Toronto Blue Jays in the 2016 draft, and made his MLB debut on July 29, 2019. Both Bo and Dante, Jr. played for Brazil in the 2017 World Baseball Classic qualifier tournament; their mother Mariana is a native of Porto Alegre, Brazil (their maternal grandfather is a native of China who immigrated to Brazil).

See also

 List of Major League Baseball career home run leaders
 List of Major League Baseball players to hit for the cycle
 List of second-generation Major League Baseball players

References

External links
 
 Little League World Series 2005 Coach Photograph

1963 births
Living people
American expatriate baseball players in Canada
Baseball coaches from Florida
Baseball players from Florida
Boston Red Sox players
California Angels players
Cincinnati Reds players
Colorado Rockies players
Colorado Rockies (baseball) coaches
Edmonton Trappers players
Major League Baseball left fielders
Major League Baseball hitting coaches
Major League Baseball right fielders
Midland Angels players
Milwaukee Brewers players
Nashua Pride players
National League All-Stars
National League RBI champions
National League home run champions
Palm Beach State Panthers baseball players
Quad Cities Angels players
Salem Angels players
Silver Slugger Award winners
Sportspeople from West Palm Beach, Florida